Midnight in America is Modern Life is War's third full-length album produced by J. Robbins.

Track listing
All tracks by Modern Life Is War

 "Useless Generation" - 3:14
 "Screaming at the Moon" - 2:24
 "Stagger Lee" - 4:08
 "Big City Dream" - 3:10
 "Fuck The Sex Pistols" - 1:04
 "Pendulum" - 1:39
 "These Mad Dogs of Glory" - 3:36
 "Night Shift At The Potato Factory" - 2:17
 "The Motorcycle Boy Reigns" - 2:14
 "Humble Streets" - 2:52
 "Midnight in America" - 3:24

Personnel

Alan Douches – Mastering
Jeffrey Eaton – Vocals
John Eich – Guitar, Vocals
Tyler Oleson – Drums
Tim Churchman - Bass, Vocals
Sjarm 13 - Guitar
James Robbins – Producer, Engineer, Mixing

Critical reception

2007 albums
Modern Life Is War albums
Equal Vision Records albums